Lacinipolia meditata, or the thinker moth, is a species of cutworm or dart moth in the family Noctuidae. It is found in North America.

The MONA or Hodges number for Lacinipolia meditata is 10368.

References

Further reading

External links

 

Eriopygini
Articles created by Qbugbot
Moths described in 1873